Eldo P. "Al" Bagnoli (born January 20, 1953) is an American football coach and former player.  He is currently the head football coach at Columbia University, a position he assumed in 2015.  Bagnoli served as a head football coach at Union College in Schenectady, New York from 1982 to 1991 and at the University of Pennsylvania from 1992 to 2014.

Playing and coaching careers
Bagnoli played three years of varsity football at Central Connecticut State University, graduating in 1975. He went on to pursue a master's degree at the University at Albany and worked there the 1975 season as a graduate assistant. He was promoted to defensive coordinator after just one season and stayed in that role until moving to NCAA Division III Union College in 1978. In 1982, he became head coach for the first time at Union.

His first year at Union was the program's first winning season in a dozen years and he posted a winning record every single year during his decade at the school. In 1983 and 1989, Bagnoli and Union reached the NCAA Division III title game and he won Coach of the Year honors twice, in 1983 and 1991.

In 1992, he was hired by the University of Pennsylvania and is arguably the most successful coach in that school's history. In 23 seasons at Penn he won nine Ivy League titles, all of them outright, an Ivy League record. In 1993, 1994, 2003, and 2009 Penn had undefeated seasons. His overall record at Penn is 148–80. He is one of only two coaches at Penn to have 100 wins at that school.  His Ivy League record at Penn was 112–49.

The only black mark on his record occurred in 1997 when all-Ivy defensive tackle Mitch Marrow was involved in an eligibility scandal. A four-university panel eventually determined that Marrow was not enrolled as a full-time student due to dropping several courses and should not have been considered eligible to play. As a result, Penn offered to forfeit all wins in games in which he appeared. This led to a 1–9 record; the on-field record in 1997 had been 6–4.

Two Penn football players have committed suicide during Bagnoli's tenure: senior running back Kyle Ambrogi during the 2005 season, and junior defensive end Owen Thomas in the spring of 2009. The death of Thomas has been attributed to chronic traumatic encephalopathy (CTE), the disease linked to concussions.

Head coaching record

See also
 List of college football coaches with 200 wins

References

External links
 Columbia profile
 Penn profile

1953 births
Living people
Albany Great Danes football coaches
Central Connecticut Blue Devils football players
Columbia Lions football coaches
Penn Quakers football coaches
Union Dutchmen football coaches